Does a Tiger Wear a Necktie? is a play written in 1969 by Don Petersen.  It has three acts, and helped to launch the careers of actors Al Pacino and Ron Thompson.

Title
The title of the play is explained by the character Fullendorf, who said, "Does a tiger wear a necktie? It ain't for us to go straight. We're like the tigers. We always chucked on raw meat. We was raised on it, and we like it."

"Does a tiger wear a necktie? No, it would be against his nature – and reform is against the nature of addicts like Bickham", Clive Barnes explained in his New York Times review.

Plot
The story is a racially charged drama about teen drug addicts at a rehabilitation center, located on an island in a river bordering a large industrial city.

An English teacher tries to make a difference in his students' lives.  He encounters barriers in trying to do this—the same barriers created by the system that hinders the addicts' development and keeps them coming back.

One addict, Bickham, is a tough teenager who searched for his father and found him working in a seedy barber shop.  Upon meeting his son, the barber shows him a dirty photograph.

Contrasting Bickham is Conrad, an African-American addict.  Conrad wants to recover and marry his love, Linda.  During the play, his character leaves the rehabilitation group to live with his sister, who is also an addict.

Aside from the students, there are only four characters in the rehabilitation center – a teacher, a psychiatrist, a policeman, and the center's principal.

Production
Does a Tiger Wear a Necktie? was directed by Michael Schultz in his Broadway debut after years of professional work with the Negro Ensemble Company, and was produced by Huntington Hartford, an heir to the A&P supermarket empire.

The original 1969 production was at the Belasco Theatre.  It had nine previews and thirty-nine performances.

Ron Thompson won the Los Angeles Drama Critics Circle Award for his 1973 theater lead performance in the play Does a Tiger Wear a Necktie?

The play enjoyed a 2002 revival at the Looking Glass Theatre in New York, where it was directed by Michael LoPorto.  It is a regular on the community and school theater circuit and in acting classes.

Cast
The play helped launch the career of Al Pacino, who won a Tony Award for Best Dramatic Actor in a Supporting Role for his portrayal of Bickham.  Jack Kroll in Newsweek said that Pacino had "the choreography of a hood, with a poetic soul."

A poll by Variety magazine of drama critics named Pacino the "most promising new Broadway actor" for his performance.

In addition to Pacino, Hal Holbrook played Mr. Winters, the teacher who cared enough to reach his students.  Lauren Jones received a 1969 Tony nomination for playing Linda.  Michael Brandon played Prince, and Conrad was portrayed by Roger Robinson.

Impact
The play portrays addicts as the victims of loveless upbringings.  They fail in isolation, or find strength in love.

The play, however, was characterized as more of a documentary about the lives of addicts and our rehabilitation system.  It does not provide morality or solutions.  It leaves judgment to the audience.

References

External links

 
 ITDb cast list
 Full script, available in paperback, 

1969 plays
Broadway plays